The egg cell, or ovum (plural ova), is the female reproductive cell, or gamete, in most anisogamous organisms (organisms that reproduce sexually with a larger, female gamete and a smaller, male one). The term is used when the female gamete is not capable of movement (non-motile). If the male gamete (sperm) is capable of movement, the type of sexual reproduction is also classified as oogamous. A nonmotile female gamete formed in the oogonium of some algae, fungi, oomycetes, or bryophytes is an oosphere. When fertilized the oosphere becomes the oospore.

When egg and sperm fuse during fertilisation, a diploid cell (the zygote) is formed, which rapidly grows into a new organism.

History 
While the non-mammalian animal egg was obvious, the doctrine ex ovo omne vivum ("every living [animal comes from] an egg"), associated with William Harvey (1578–1657), was a rejection of spontaneous generation and preformationism as well as a bold assumption that mammals also reproduced via eggs. Karl Ernst von Baer discovered the mammalian ovum in 1827. The fusion of spermatozoa with ova (of a starfish) was observed by Oskar Hertwig in 1876.

Animals 
In animals, egg cells are also known as ova (singular ovum, from the Latin word  meaning 'egg'). The term ovule in animals is used for the young ovum of an animal. In vertebrates, ova are produced by female gonads (sex glands) called ovaries. A number of ova are present at birth in mammals and mature via oogenesis.

Studies performed on humans, dogs, and cats in the 1870s suggested that the production of oocytes (immature egg cells) stops at or shortly after birth. A review of reports from 1900 to 1950 by zoologist Solomon Zuckerman cemented the belief that females have a finite number of oocytes that are formed before they are born. This dogma has been challenged by a number of studies since 2004. Several studies suggest that ovarian stem cells exist within the mammalian ovary. Whether or not mature mammals can actually create new egg cells remains uncertain and is an ongoing research question.

Mammals including humans 

In all mammals except monotremes, the ovum is fertilized inside the female body.

The human ova grow from primitive germ cells that are embedded in the substance of the ovaries. Each of them divides repeatedly to give secretions of the uterine glands, ultimately forming a blastocyst.

The ovum is one of the largest cells in the human body, typically visible to the naked eye without the aid of a microscope or other magnification device.

Ooplasm 
Ooplasm (also: oöplasm) is the yolk of the ovum, a cell substance at its center, which contains its nucleus, named the germinal vesicle, and the nucleolus, called the germinal disc.

The ooplasm consists of the cytoplasm of the ordinary animal cell with its spongioplasm and hyaloplasm, often called the formative yolk; and the nutritive yolk or deutoplasm, made of rounded granules of fatty and albuminoid substances imbedded in the cytoplasm.

Mammalian ova contain only a tiny amount of the nutritive yolk, for nourishing the embryo in the early stages of its development only. In contrast, bird eggs contain enough to supply the chick with nutriment throughout the whole period of incubation.

Ova development in oviparous animals 
In the oviparous animals (all birds, most fish, amphibians and reptiles) the ova develop protective layers and pass through the oviduct to the outside of the body. They are fertilized by male sperm either inside the female body (as in birds), or outside (as in many fish). After fertilization, an embryo develops, nourished by nutrients contained in the egg. It then hatches from the egg, outside the mother's body. See egg for a discussion of eggs of oviparous animals.

The egg cell's cytoplasm and mitochondria are the sole means the egg can reproduce by mitosis and eventually form a blastocyst after fertilization.

Ovoviviparity
There is an intermediate form, the ovoviviparous animals: the embryo develops within and is nourished by an egg as in the oviparous case, but then it hatches inside the mother's body shortly before birth, or just after the egg leaves the mother's body. Some fish, reptiles and many invertebrates use this technique.

Plants
Nearly all land plants have alternating diploid and haploid generations. Gametes are produced by the gametophyte, which is the haploid generation. The female gametophyte produces structures called archegonia, and the egg cells form within them via mitosis. The typical bryophyte archegonium consists of a long neck with a wider base containing the egg cell. Upon maturation, the neck opens to allow sperm cells to swim into the archegonium and fertilize the egg. The resulting zygote then gives rise to an embryo, which will grow into a new diploid individual (sporophyte). In seed plants, a structure called the ovule contains the female gametophyte. The gametophyte produces an egg cell. After fertilization, the ovule develops into a seed containing the embryo.

In flowering plants, the female gametophyte (sometimes referred to as the embryo sac) has been reduced to just eight cells inside the ovule. The gametophyte cell closest to the micropyle opening of the ovule develops into the egg cell. Upon pollination, a pollen tube delivers sperm into the gametophyte and one sperm nucleus fuses with the egg nucleus. The resulting zygote develops into an embryo inside the ovule. The ovule, in turn, develops into a seed and in many cases, the plant ovary develops into a fruit to facilitate the dispersal of the seeds. Upon germination, the embryo grows into a seedling.

In the moss Physcomitrella patens, the Polycomb protein FIE is expressed in the unfertilised egg cell (Figure, right) as the blue colour after GUS staining reveals. Soon after fertilisation the FIE gene is inactivated (the blue colour is no longer visible, left) in the young embryo.

Other organisms
In algae, the egg cell is often called oosphere.  Drosophila oocytes develop in individual egg chambers that are supported by nurse cells and surrounded by somatic follicle cells.  The nurse cells are large polyploid cells that synthesize and transfer RNA, proteins, and organelles to the oocytes.  This transfer is followed by the programmed cell death (apoptosis) of the nurse cells.  During oogenesis, 15 nurse cells die for every oocyte that is produced.  In addition to this developmentally regulated cell death, egg cells may also undergo apoptosis in response to starvation and other insults.

See also

 Egg
 Fertilization
 Insemination
 Menstrual cycle
 Ova bank
 Ovulation
 Polar body
 Pollination
 Pregnancy
 Spawn (biology)

References

External links
 The Ovarian Kaleidoscope Database description of 1800 genes involved in ovarian functions

Germ cells
Cloning
Eggs
Human female reproductive system
Human female endocrine system